Markus Västilä (born 30 November 1992) is a Finnish professional ice hockey player. He is currently playing for Nybro IF of the Hockeyettan.

Markus Västilä made his Liiga debut playing with Ilves during the 2011–12 Liiga season

Career statistics

Regular season and playoffs

References

External links

1992 births
Living people
Peliitat Heinola players
Lempäälän Kisa players
Ilves players
Finnish ice hockey defencemen
Ice hockey people from Tampere
KooKoo players
Finnish expatriate ice hockey players in Slovakia
KOOVEE players
HC Nové Zámky players
Finnish expatriate ice hockey players in Sweden